Qeysevand (also known as Qeysehvand) is a village in Razavar Rural District, in the Central District of Kermanshah County, Kermanshah Province, Iran. At the 2006 census, its population was 532, in 116 families.

References 

Populated places in Kermanshah County